15 Éxitos Vol. 2 is a compilation album by Mexican group Los Caminantes, released in 1985 on Luna Records. It is the second of a three volume greatest hits collection from their Supe Perder, Especialmente Para Usted, and Numero Tres albums.

Track listing

References
Allmusic page
 

1985 greatest hits albums
Los Caminantes compilation albums
Spanish-language compilation albums